Bobby Allen (born December 28, 1943) is an American racecar driver known for racing winged sprint cars. He currently owns Shark Racing, a World of Outlaws sprint car team that fields two cars driven by his son Jacob Allen and his grandson Logan Schuchart.

Early life
Allen was born to Joe and Jane Allen in Daytona, Florida. His father had driven stock cars with NASCAR during its early years before becoming a pilot and moving the family to Miami. In his teenage years, Allen had dreamed of driving at the Indianapolis 500.

Racing career
Allen's first racing experience came in Florida at twelve years old in half midgets, and he soon moved up into kart racing. In 1960, he won the World Champion karting event in Nassau, Bahamas, organized by the Go Kart Club of America. The following year in 1961, he won the 100cc karting World Championship in Milan, Italy.

Modified and supermodified racing
In the early 1960s, Allen raced modified and supermodified racecars in Florida. In the mid-1960s, he moved north and settled in Hanover, Pennsylvania. As Allen convinced several other out-of-state drivers to move north to join him, they became known as the "Hanover Gang".

Sprint car racing
Allen built his first sprint car in 1968. He claims over 276 sprint car wins across numerous tracks and series. He was a charter member of the World of Outlaws sprint car series when it debuted in 1978, and finished third in the point standings that inaugural year. He recorded 30 wins in that series, joining fewer than two dozen drivers in Outlaws history who have achieved 25 or more wins. He can also claim 46 wins in the All Star Circuit of Champions, putting him in the top 10 all-time in that series.

Accomplishments
Knoxville Nationals winner, 1990
National Sprint Car Hall of Fame, 1998 inductee
Eastern Motorsport Press Association Hall of Fame, 2006 inductee

References

1943 births
American motorsport people
Living people
People from Daytona Beach, Florida
World of Outlaws drivers